Dominik Máthé (born 1 April 1999) is a Hungarian handball player for Paris Saint-Germain and the Hungarian national team.

He represented Hungary at the 2019 World Men's Handball Championship.

Individual awards
 Hungarian Junior Handballer of the Year: 2018

References

External links

 

1999 births
Living people
Hungarian male handball players
People from Nyíregyháza
Sportspeople from Szabolcs-Szatmár-Bereg County